CSAT may refer to:

 Cebu School of Arts and Trades, former name of Cebu Technological University, Cebu, Philippines
 Civil Services Aptitude Test, in India, a preliminary stage of the Civil Services Examination which is conducted by the Union Public Service Commission for recruitment into government and law enforcement jobs.
 College Scholastic Ability Test, a standardized test in South Korea
 Supreme Council of National Defense (Romania) (Consiliul Suprem de Apărare a Ţării), an autonomous administrative authority in Romania
 Customer satisfaction measure or index (Market Research)
 Circuit satisfiability problem, a classic NP-complete problem in computer science
 Commonwealth Secretariat arbitral tribunal
 Certified Sex Addiction Therapist, a therapeutic accreditation granted by the International Institute for Trauma and Addiction Professionals
 Canton-Protocol Strategic Alliance Treaty, a faction in the 2013 video game ARMA 3